Lacidipine (tradenames Lacipil or Motens) is a calcium channel blocker. It is available as tablets containing 2 or 4 mg.

It was patented in 1984 and approved for medical use in 1991.

References

External links 
 Motens 2 mg Summary of Product Characteristics

Alkene derivatives
Carboxylate esters
Dihydropyridines
Cinnamate esters
Ethyl esters
Tert-butyl compounds